Syringic acid is a naturally occurring phenolic compound and dimethoxybenzene that is commonly found as a plant metabolite.

Natural occurrence 
Syringic acid can be found in several plants including Ardisia elliptica and Schumannianthus dichotomus.

Synthesis 
Syringic acid can be prepared by selectively hydrolyzing (demethylating) eudesmic acid with 20% sulfuric acid.

Presence in food 
Syringic acid can be found in several fruits including olives, dates, spices, pumpkin, grapes, acai palm, honey, red wine, among others. Its presence in the ancient Egyptian drink shedeh could confirm it was made out of grape, as syringic acid is released by the breakdown of the compound malvidin, also found in red wine. It is also found in vinegar.

Applications 
Various studies have found syringic acid to exhibit useful pharmaceutical properties such as anti-oxidant, anti-microbial, anti-inflammation, anti-cancer, and anti-diabetic.

Syringic acid can be enzymatically polymerised. Laccase and peroxidase induced the polymerization of syringic acid to give a poly(1,4-phenylene oxide) bearing a carboxylic acid at one end and a phenolic hydroxyl group at the other.

See also 

Phenolic content in wine
Syringol
Syringaldehyde
Acetosyringone
Sinapyl alcohol
Sinapinic acid
Sinapaldehyde
Sinapine
Canolol

References 

Trihydroxybenzoic acids
O-methylated natural phenols
Progestogens